The novelization of the film Star Trek was written in 2009 by Alan Dean Foster, who had also written novelizations of Star Trek: The Animated Series.

Paramount moved the film's release from December 2008 to May 2009, as the studio felt more people would see the film during summer than winter. The film was practically finished by the end of 2008, and this allowed Foster to watch the whole film before writing the novelization, although the novel contains scenes absent from the film's final edit.

References

2009 American novels
Novels based on Star Trek
Novels based on films
Novels by Alan Dean Foster